Castro Street (1966) is a visual nonstory documentary film directed by Bruce Baillie.

Summary
Inspired by Satie, the film uses the sounds and sights of a city street—in this case, Castro Street near the Standard Oil Refinery in Richmond, California, complete with diesel trains and gas plants—to convey the street's own mood and feel as there is no dialogue in this non-narrative experimental film.

Legacy
In 1992, the film was selected for preservation in the United States National Film Registry by the Library of Congress as being "culturally, historically, or aesthetically significant". The Academy Film Archive preserved Castro Street in 2000.

External links 
Castro Street essay by Scott MacDonald on the National Film Registry website. 
Castro Street essayby Daniel Eagan in America's Film Legacy: The Authoritative Guide to the Landmark Movies in the National Film Registry, A&C Black, 2010 , pages 616-617 

 Castro Street at the Library of Congress
 Castro Street on Letterboxd

See also
List of American films of 1966
Bruce Baillie
Canyon Cinema

References

1966 films
Documentary films about cities in the United States
Richmond, California
Films without speech
American short documentary films
United States National Film Registry films
Films directed by Bruce Baillie
1966 documentary films
Rail transport films
Documentary films about California
1966 short films
1960s American films